Christopher Austin Martin (born March 23, 1999) is an American professional baseball shortstop in the Minnesota Twins organization. He played college baseball for the Vanderbilt Commodores.

Amateur career
Martin attended Trinity Christian Academy in Jacksonville, Florida. In 2014, he was selected 15U United States national baseball team. Martin was drafted by the Cleveland Indians in the 37th round of the 2017 Major League Baseball draft, but did not sign and instead attended Vanderbilt University where he played college baseball for the Vanderbilt Commodores.
 
As a freshman in 2018, Martin started 58 games at six different positions. He hit .338/.452/.414 with one home run, 19 runs batted in and 22 stolen bases. He played mostly third base his sophomore year in 2019. In 65 games, he hit .410/.503/.619 with eight home runs and 42 runs batted in, and helped lead Vanderbilt to victory in the 2019 College World Series against the Michigan Wolverines. His .410 average led the Southeastern Conference. After the season, he played for the United States collegiate national team. Before the suspension of his junior season due to the COVID-19 pandemic, Martin had appeared in 16 games and hit .377 with three home runs and 11 runs batted in.

Professional career

Toronto Blue Jays
Martin was considered by MLB.com to be the "best pure hitter" and a top prospect in the 2020 Major League Baseball draft, projecting as a top three with potential to be drafted first overall. He was selected fifth overall by the Toronto Blue Jays and was announced as a shortstop. He received a $7 million signing bonus.

Martin made his professional debut in 2021 with the New Hampshire Fisher Cats of the Double-A Northeast. In June, he was selected to play in the All-Star Futures Game. Over 56 games with New Hampshire, Martin slashed .281/.424/.383 with two home runs, 16 runs batted in, and nine stolen bases.

Minnesota Twins
On July 30, 2021, Martin was traded to the Minnesota Twins along with Simeon Woods Richardson for José Berríos. Martin was assigned to the Wichita Wind Surge of the Double-A Central with whom he finished the season. Over 37 games, he batted .254 with three home runs and 19 runs batted in. Martin spent the 2022 season with Double-A Wichita, playing in 90 games and hitting .241/.367/.316 with 2 home runs, 32 runs batted in, and 34 stolen bases.

On March 5, 2023, Martin was shut down with a sprain of the ulnar collateral ligament in his right elbow.

References

External links

Vanderbilt Commodores bio

1999 births
Living people
Baseball players from Florida
Baseball third basemen
People from DeLand, Florida
Sportspeople from Volusia County, Florida
United States national baseball team players
Vanderbilt Commodores baseball players
Wichita Wind Surge players